Darrah may refer to:

People
John W. Darrah (1938-2017), United States federal judge
Lydia Darragh (1728-1789), who provided intelligence to George Washington
Thomas Walter Darrah (1873-1955), United States military officer

Places
Darrah, Alabama, United States
Darrah, California, United States
Darrah National Park, in Rajasthan, India

Other
Darrah procedure, surgical procedure